This is a list of characters from the Canadian teen drama series Edgemont which aired on CBC Television in Canada. These lists are in alphabetical order by last name.

The following characters have all appeared in the opening sequence of Edgemont as "regulars".
The season(s) they appear as "recurring" means they weren't featured in the credits, yet still star in the season frequently.

Main characters

Minor characters

See also
 Edgemont (TV series)
 List of Edgemont episodes

Lists of Canadian television series characters
Lists of drama television characters